The Social Icons are a Canadian indie rock band formed in 2009 in Ottawa. Formed by Nickolai Dangeroso (formerly Nick Danger) who is the principal songwriter as well as vocalist and guitarist. The other members of the band are Terry O'Reilly on bass guitar and CHUNKK on percussion.   
They are one of the original artists on Ottawa based indie label, The Beautiful Music along with Skytone (band).

After the breakup Nick Danger and the Danger City Rebels and departure of original bassist "Popsicle" Pete Connell, they recruited ex-Tremolo bassist Terry O'Reilly. Although they played a few more gigs as Nick Danger, they agreed that the DCR was over. The sonic direction of their music had evolved. Dangeroso's original surf/rock sound had broadened to include other influences, including O'Reilly's 90's grunge-rock inspired bass stylings and Nielson's funk-infused drum beats.

In late 2008 they released their debut EP on German record label Vollwert Records Berlin. This was followed up in 2010 by their 14 track CD "I'm there...you're here". Both albums featured Mike Dubue of the Hilotrons/Kepler (band) and was recorded at Bovasound in Ottawa.

The Social Icons songs have charted on Canadian campus radio charts and have been in rotation on CBC and international indie radio stations.

Discography
The Social Icons (2009) Vollwert Records Berlin
I'm there...you're here (2010) The Beautiful Music

References
, Pennyblack Music (2009-04-31). Retrieved on 7 May 2010.
, The Ottawa Citizen (2010-04-08). Retrieved on 7 May 2010.
Campus Radio Charts, CKCU-FM (2010-04-05). Retrieved on 7 May 2010.

External links
The Social Icons Official site
The Social Icons - Official MySpace Site
 - Vollwert Records Berlin Record Label
 - The Beautiful Music Record Label
The Social Icons - Official Fan Club Site

Musical groups established in 2009
Musical groups from Ottawa
Canadian indie rock groups
2009 establishments in Ontario